Phlegmacium ponderosum, also known as the Ponderous Cortinarius, is a species of mushroom producing fungus in the family Cortinariaceae. It is very large and due to its thick stem it can be mistaken for Boletus edulis.

Taxonomy 
It was described in 1939 by the American mycologist Alexander H. Smith who classified it as Cortinarius ponderosus.

In 2022 the species was transferred from Cortinarius and reclassified as Phlegmacium ponderosum based on genomic data.

Description 
It often has an olive metallic tinge, and the surface is viscid, often with small rusty brown scales. The margin is ocher and remains inrolled until the mushroom is fully mature. The flesh of the mushroom is yellow-white, thick and firm, with a mild to sour odor. The gills are rusty brown, adnate and slightly decurrent. It has a slimy yellow universal veil, and the cortina leaves a rusty brown hairy area on the upper stalk. The spores are brown and elliptical.

Its edibility is unknown, but it is not recommended due to its similarity to deadly poisonous species.

Cortinarius infractus is a similar species that usually has a smaller cap.

Etymology 
The specific epithet ponderosum (originally ponderosus) is named for the Pinus ponderosa trees which Smith observed the mushrooms growing under.

Habitat and distribution 
Smith observed the mushrooms growing under Pinus ponderosa and Quercus (Oak) species near Cave City in Oregon and under Spruce trees near Crescent City, California.

See also
List of Cortinarius species

References

 -- Cortinarius ponderosus
 Cortinarius ponderosus photo
 Cortinarius ponderosus info

ponderosus
Fungi of North America
Fungi described in 1939